Forsaken or The Forsaken may refer to:

Film and television
 "Forsaken" (Stargate SG-1), the eighteenth episode of the sixth season of Stargate SG-1
 "The Forsaken" (Star Trek: Deep Space Nine), the seventeenth episode of the first season of Star Trek: Deep Space Nine
 The Forsaken (2001 film), a 2001 horror/thriller film starring Brendan Fehr and Kerr Smith
 The Prophecy: Forsaken, the latest film in The Prophecy series
 Forsaken (2015 film), a western-drama film starring Kiefer Sutherland and Donald Sutherland
 Forsaken (2018 film), a Russian film

Gaming
 Forsaken (video game), a first person shooting video game similar to Descent
 Forsaken (series), a series of World of Warcraft machinima produced by Edgeworks Entertainment
 The Forsaken, an undead faction in the Warcraft series of games
 Werewolf: The Forsaken, a role-playing game published by White Wolf, Inc
 Destiny 2: Forsaken, the third expansion to 2017's first-person shooter Destiny 2

Literature
 Forsaken (Wheel of Time), a group of characters from the Wheel of Time fantasy series
 Forsaken (novel), a 2016 historical novel

Music
 The Forsaken (album), an album by the black metal band Antestor
 Forsaken (album), an album by the Irish alternative rock band Hail The Ghost
 "Forsaken", a song by Dream Theater from the album Systematic Chaos
 "Forsaken", a song by As I Lay Dying from the album An Ocean Between Us
 "Forsaken", a song by VNV Nation from the album Praise the Fallen
 "Forsaken", a song by Within Temptation from the album The Silent Force
 "Forsaken", a song by David Draiman from the soundtrack Queen of the Damned
 "Forsaken", a song by Skillet from the album Collide
 "Forsaken", a song by Seether from the album Holding Onto Strings Better Left to Fray